Colours 2 (stylized in all caps) is the third extended play by Canadian recording artist PartyNextDoor. It was released on June 2, 2017, by OVO Sound and Warner Records. This is the sequel to his previous EP, Colours (2014) and following 2016's PartyNextDoor 3 album.

Background
The EP was recorded within a span of five days.

Track listing

Notes
  signifies a co-producer
  signifies an additional producer

Personnel

Performers
 PartyNextDoor – primary artist

Technical
 David Hughes – recording engineer 
 Chris Athens – mastering engineer 
 Dave Huffman – mastering engineer 
 Noel Campbell – mixing engineer 

Production
 G. Ry – producer 
 PartyNextDoor – producer 
 OZ – co-producer 
 Neenyo – producer 
 Top FLR – producer 
 40 – additional producer 
 M3rge – producer 
 Wallis Lane – producer

References

2017 EPs
Albums produced by PartyNextDoor
PartyNextDoor albums
OVO Sound EPs
Warner Records EPs